4581 Asclepius , provisional designation , is a sub-kilometer-sized asteroid, classified as near-Earth object and potentially hazardous asteroid of the Apollo group that makes close orbital passes with Earth. Discovered on 31 March 1989 by American astronomers Henry Holt and Norman Thomas at Palomar Observatory, Asclepius is named after the Greek demigod of medicine and healing.

Although this exceeds the Moon's orbital radius, the close pass received attention at that time. "On the cosmic scale of things, that was a close call", said Dr. Henry Holt. Geophysicists estimate that collision with Asclepius would release energy comparable to the explosion of a 600 megaton atomic bomb. The asteroid was discovered 31 March 1989, nine days after its closest approach to the Earth.

Subsequent discoveries revealed that a whole class of such objects exists. Close approaches by objects the size of Asclepius pass by every two or three years, undetected until the start of computerized near-Earth object searches.

On 24 March 2051, the asteroid will pass  from the Earth. It will be the eighth pass of less than 30 Gm in this century. JPL shows that the uncertainty region of the asteroid will cause it to most likely pass from 0.02 AU to 0.17 AU from the Earth in 2135.

References

External links 
 Asteroid Lightcurve Database (LCDB), query form (info )
 Dictionary of Minor Planet Names, Google books
 Discovery Circumstances: Numbered Minor Planets (1)–(5000) Minor Planet Center
 
 

004581
Discoveries by Henry E. Holt
Discoveries by Norman G. Thomas
Named minor planets
004581
19890331